Spain competed at the 2015 World Aquatics Championships in Kazan, Russia from 24 July to 9 August 2015.

Medalists

Diving

Spanish divers qualified for the individual spots and the synchronized teams at the World Championships.

Men

Women

High diving

Spain has qualified one high diver at the World Championships.

Open water swimming

Spain sent a full team of five swimmers to compete in the open water marathon.

Swimming

Spanish swimmers have achieved qualifying standards in the following events (up to a maximum of 2 swimmers in each event at the A-standard entry time, and 1 at the B-standard): Swimmers must qualify at the 2015 Spanish Open Spring Championships (for pool events) to confirm their places for the Worlds.

The Spanish team consists of 14 swimmers (seven men and seven women). Two-time Olympic silver medalist Mireia Belmonte García was set to compete for the Worlds, but later withdrew from the team because of shoulder injury.

Men

Women

Synchronized swimming

Spain fielded a full squad of thirteen synchronized swimmers (one male and twelve female) to compete in each of the following events.

Women

Mixed

Water polo

Women's tournament

Team roster

Laura Ester
Marta Bach
Anni Espar
Paula Leitón
Matilde Ortiz
Jennifer Pareja
Clara Espar
Pilar Peña
Judith Forca
Roser Tarragó
Maica García
Laura López
Patricia Herrera

Group play

Quarterfinals

5th–8th place semifinals

Seventh place game

References

External links
 Real Federación Española de Natación 

Nations at the 2015 World Aquatics Championships
2015 in Spanish sport
Spain at the World Aquatics Championships